Celestyn Chołodecki (1816–1867) was a member from the szlachta (noble) family of Chołodecki.
Like his son to follow, Józef Białynia Chołodecki, Celestyn Chołodecki was a writer and frequent contributor to leaflets calling for Poland's independence from Russia.  He was the brother of Tomasz Chołodecki, who was widely known in the area of Galicia as an activist and rebel.

References

Celestyn Chołodecki (Białynia): wspomnienie z minionej doby (Celestyn Cholodecki (Białynia): remembrances from a time past) Kazimierz Baranowski, Lwów 1907
Chołodecki, Białynia Józef. Białynia-Chołodeccy : uczestnicy spisków, więźniowie stanu (History of the Cholodecki family of the Bialynia Clan). 1911

1816 births
1867 deaths
Celestyn